The 1997 Libyan Super Cup was a two-legged football match that took place between Friday, October 24, 1997, and Monday, October 27 between LPL winners Al Tahaddy and Libyan Al Fatah Cup winners Al Nasr. This was the first edition of the competition, and as this was an all-Benghazi final, both legs were played at the March 28 Stadium, consequently the home stadium of both sides. Al Tahaddy won the match 1–0 over the two legs, and claimed the first Super Cup title.

Match details

First leg

Second leg

Libyan Super Cup
Super Cup